Ada High School is a public high school located in Ada, Ohio.  It is the only high school in the Ada Exempted Village School District.

The District spends $7,419 per pupil in current expenditures.  The district spends 63% on instruction, 32% on support services, and 4% on other elementary and secondary expenditures.

It has 16 students for every full-time equivalent teacher, with the OH state average being 19 students per full-time equivalent teacher.  13% of students have an Individualized Education Program (IEP).  An IEP is a written plan for students eligible for special needs services.

Ohio High School Athletic Association state championships
 Girls Basketball – 1978

Notable alumni
Zac Dysert, NFL player

References

External links
 District Website
 Great Schools, Inc

High schools in Hardin County, Ohio
Public high schools in Ohio
High School